Canton of Les Abymes-2 is a canton in the Arrondissement of Pointe-à-Pitre on the island of Guadeloupe.

Municipalities
The canton includes part of the commune of Les Abymes.

See also
 Cantons of Guadeloupe
 Communes of Guadeloupe
 Arrondissements of Guadeloupe

References

Abymes-2